The East German mark, commonly called the eastern mark in West Germany and after reunification), in East Germany only Mark, was the currency of the German Democratic Republic (East Germany). Its ISO 4217 currency code was DDM. The currency was known officially as the Deutsche Mark from 1948 to 1964, Mark der Deutschen Notenbank from 1964 to 1967, and from 1968 to 1990 as the Mark der DDR (Mark of the GDR). The mark (M) was divided into 100 Pfennig (pf).

History

1948 
On 18 June 1948 a currency reform was announced for the western zones. Subsequently,
on 20 June 1948, the reichsmark and the rentenmark were abolished in the western occupation zones due to Soviet counterfeiting of AM-Marks resulting in economic instability and inflation and replaced with the Deutsche Mark issued by the Bank deutscher Länder (later the Deutsche Bundesbank). Because the Reichsmark was still legal tender in the Soviet occupation zone, the currency flooded into the east from the west, where it was worthless. This caused sudden inflation, which caused privately held cash in the Soviet zone to become worthless overnight. Only such banknotes could be exchanged when the Deutsche Notenbank (the East German counterpart of the Bundesbank) issued the new Deutsche Mark with the subsequent currency reform.

Although the Soviets expressed on 21 June 1948 their surprise about the western currency reform, the German Economic Commission, per consultation with the Soviet Military Administration had already made preparations for this case. The adhesive coupons had already been printed and, with logistic assistance by the Soviets, distributed among the district offices. First affixings of the coupons started immediately, already on 19 June 1948. On 23 June 1948, the official starting day of the action, a considerable store of primed banknotes was already available. This enabled to reduce waiting times and to accelerate the process by exchanging these notes for unprimed banknotes.

On 24 July 1948, a completely new series of banknotes was issued.  It maintained the official name Deutsche Mark von der Deutschen Notenbank until 1964, but it was known, especially in the west, as the Ostmark, or eastern mark.

1960s 
 
From 1964 to 1967, the East German mark was officially designated as the Mark der Deutschen Notenbank (MDN). With the constitutional amendments of 1968 and 1974, the leadership of East Germany moved away from the original goal of a unified Germany, using the phrase "... of the GDR" where earlier they would simply have said "German ...".  In this way the name of the currency was changed from MDN to Mark der Deutschen Demokratischen Republik (Mark der DDR) (M), or "Mark of the GDR", and the name of the state bank from Deutsche Notenbank to Staatsbank der DDR.  Coins minted before the renaming, with the legend Deutsche Mark (i.e., in DM 1 and DM 2 denominations), continued to circulate for several years, but they were gradually replaced by the early 1980s by coins with the legend Mark.

International exchange

The East German mark was officially valued by the East German government at parity with the (West German) Deutsche Mark. However, due to limited convertibility and a restricted export profile, it was essentially worthless outside of East Germany. The few East Germans able to visit the West often found themselves having to rely on their West German relatives as a result.

Beginning in 1964, the East German government instituted a Zwangsumtausch (forced exchange) (or Mindestumtausch – minimum exchange), whereby most visitors from non-socialist foreign countries were required to exchange a set amount of Deutsche Marks (or other hard currencies) for East German marks at the ratio of one Deutsche Mark to one East German mark for every day of their stay. Starting on 13 October 1980, Western visitors to the GDR were required to exchange a minimum of DM25 for East German marks per day. Some exceptions were authorized: for example, tourists who booked hotel stays in the GDR that were paid in hard currency were exempted from the minimum exchange requirements.  (Of course, such accommodation charges almost always exceeded the DM 25 daily exchange threshold.) At other times, West Berliners, retirees, children, and youth were granted either exemptions or were authorized reduced minimum exchange amounts.  Members of the Western Allied military forces stationed in West Berlin were also exempt from these rules when visiting East Berlin, in part because the Western Allies did not recognize the authority of the GDR to regulate the activities of their military personnel in East Berlin; only the Soviet Union was considered competent to do so.

On the black market, the exchange rate was about 5 to 10 Mark der DDR to one Deutsche Mark. In the mid-1980s, one could easily visit foreign currency exchange offices in West Berlin and purchase East German banknotes (in denominations of 50 and 100 Mark der DDR) at the rate of M 5 (East) = DM 1 (West).  However, the GDR forbade the import or export of East German currency (as well as currencies of other socialist countries) into or out of the GDR, and penalties for violation ranged from confiscation of smuggled currency to imprisonment.  The East German mark could not be spent in Intershops to acquire Western consumer goods; only hard currencies or Forum checks were accepted. As a result, the main purchasers of black market East German banknotes were Allied military personnel entering East Berlin, as they were exempt from East German customs inspection.

Adoption of the West German Deutsche Mark

Upon adoption of the Deutsche Mark in East Germany on 1 July 1990, the East German mark was converted at par for wages, prices and basic savings (up to a limit of M 4,000 per person, except a smaller number for children and a larger number for pensioners). Larger amounts of savings, company debts and housing loans were converted at a 2:1 rate whilst so-called "speculative money", acquired shortly before unification, was converted at a rate of 3:1. These inflated exchange rates were intended by the government of the Federal Republic of Germany as a massive subsidy for eastern Germany, and remain controversial among economists, with some arguing that the exchange of currency was the most practical way of quickly unifying the German economy, and others arguing that the exchange increased the disruption caused by German unification by, among other things, making eastern German industries uncompetitive.

Destruction of East German currency

Around 4,500 tonnes of East German coins were melted down at the Rackwitz metal works in 1990. In total, 3,000 tonnes of banknotes, passbooks, and checks were stored there, having been brought by military convoy from the Staatsbank der DDR in Berlin. The currency became the property of the Kreditanstalt für Wiederaufbau (KfW) in 1994 through its merger with the Staatsbank Berlin (the post-reunification name for the Staatsbank der DDR). The  tunnel system had been built by forced labour during World War II, and used by the National People's Army under the code name "Malachit", or camp complex KL-12 NVA-Nr.16/630. It was the bunker with the largest floor space, and was used for the safeguarding of devices and munitions that would be needed for war. For cost reasons, the money was left to rot under the natural humidity, but it was further covered with gravel.

In July 2001, it was discovered that two Halberstadt residents (aged 24 and 26) had gained entry to the tunnel system through an unsecured opening and made off with numerous banknotes. The two residents were convicted of the crime and sentenced to four months in prison and three years of probation. Furthermore, they had to pay €120 to a non-profit organisation. The appearance among collectors of uncirculated M 200 and M 500 DDR notes, and of the never-issued military currency, is attributed to this theft. Because of the theft and the slowness of the rotting, the KfW then decided to burn the old currency. Between April and June 2002, 298 containers of the currency remains were burned in an incinerator (six containers per day) along with household refuse. The last container was burned on 25 June 2002.

Coins
The first issue of Eastern coins was released in 1948, inscribed with "Deutschland", and consisted of aluminium 1pf, 5pf and 10pf denominations, depicting a wheat stalk atop a cogwheel, with aluminium-bronze 50pf coins added in 1950 depicting a factory. The 1952 series of the smaller coins depict a compass and hammer in addition to wheat.

Starting with the 1pf in 1960, followed by the 10pf in 1963, and the 5pf in 1968, the old style coins were gradually replaced with new coins depicting the state name "Deutsche Demokratische Republik." Aluminium M1, M2 and 50pf pieces were released for circulation in 1956, 1957 and 1958, respectively. In 1969, brass 20pf coins were introduced, with nickel-bronze (later cupro-nickel) M5 coins issued from 1968. In 1973 and 1974, M1 and M2 coins were redesigned dropping the former "Deutsche Mark" title. The brass 20pf coins were issued because pay telephones had a standard charge of 20pf and were having problems with aluminium coins jamming due to their light weight. Commemorative M5, M10, and M20 coins of various types have also occasionally made it into circulation. The aluminium content of the coins meant that East German coins were nicknamed "alu-chips".

For several months after the July 1990 adoption of the Deutsche Mark, low value GDR coinage (up to 50pf) continued to circulate in the former GDR as legal tender, because the Bundesbank could not deliver enough small coins quickly enough to replace the former GDR coins.

Commemorative coins

There were 123 commemorative coins altogether, with face values of M5, M10 or M20. The coins were released for various anniversaries or special events. Silver, copper/nickel/zinc (German silver / nickel silver) or other alloys were used for the coins. A complete list of all released commemorative coins can be found in the "Liste der Gedenkmünzen der DDR". Some of the commemorative coins were produced in very large volumes, especially the one shown above. These coins entered circulation, because they had little or no additional value for collectors due to the large numbers issued.

Banknotes

East German military currency
In 1980, East Germany prepared special military banknotes intended to be used in international missions of the National People's Army (NVA), but they were never issued. These military notes consist of the 1955 series (DN B13 – DN B17) handstamped with the coat of arms and—in some cases—overprinted Musternote (Sample Note) or Militärgeld (Military Money). Preparations were made to introduce them in 1980, but this never occurred. Instead, in 1990 and 1991, these and other old and unissued East German notes and coins were stored in bunkers in massive sandstone caverns in the Thekenberge near Halberstadt. However, a pair of local citizens gained entry to this cache over the next decade and stole some of its contents, including the unissued military notes dated 1955, as well as two unissued notes dated 1985. In response to this theft, the remaining paper money was incinerated between April and 25 June 2002. Only a few genuine military banknotes exist; however, an abundance of 1955 series banknotes survived, as did the coat of arms handstamp. Many military banknotes have since been fabricated and it's impossible to distinguish them from genuine notes.

See also

 Heinrich Rau
 Economy of East Germany

References

Further reading

External links

Coins of East Germany
Historical banknotes of the German Democratic Republic

Economy of East Germany
Currencies of Germany
Modern obsolete currencies
1948 establishments in Germany
1990 disestablishments in East Germany
Currencies introduced in 1948